Diede de Groot defeated the two-time defending champion Yui Kamiji in the final, 6–1, 6–0 to win the women's singles wheelchair tennis title at the 2019 French Open. With the win, de Groot completed a non-calendar-year Grand Slam and the career Grand Slam, becoming the first wheelchair tennis player to do each in singles.

Seeds

Draw

Finals

References
 Draw

Wheelchair Women's Singles
French Open, 2019 Women's Singles